Conogethes punctiferalis, the durian fruit borer or yellow peach moth, is a moth of the family Crambidae.

Description 
The larvae live concealed in their foodplant in a case lined with silk. Full-grown larvae are about 20 mm long. It is considered a pest on fruit trees. Adults have a wingspan of 14–20 mm. Adults are yellow with a dark pattern.

Distribution 

It is found from India and Pakistan through south-east Asia to Australia. It has been reported from various parts of the world, mainly because larvae are imported alongside fruit. Records include Hawaii, Great Britain and the Netherlands.

Diet 
The larvae feed on a wide range of plants, including Zea mays, Livistona humilis, Helianthus annuus, Durio zibethinus, Carica papaya, Ricinus communis, Planchonia careya, Sorghum bicolor, Macadamia integrifolia, Prunus persica, Citrus limon, Nephelium lappaceum, Solanum melongena, Brachychiton acerifolium and Elettaria cardamomum.

External links 
 UKmoths

Spilomelinae
Insect pests of millets
Moths described in 1854
Moths of Asia
Taxa named by Achille Guenée